Arthur John Street (3 January 1932 – 6 January 2009), better known as John Street, was an English professional snooker referee.

Street was born in Devon on 3 January 1932. During World War II he was evacuated to the north-east of England and, after the war, was hospitalised for 14 months due to tuberculosis. He started refereeing matches in 1960. His first professional refereeing role was at the 1974 World Snooker Championship and his first televised match was during the 1978 Masters. He worked for the Pearl Assurance company as an insurance agent for 18 years until leaving the role to focus on refereeing professionally. Before becoming an insurance agent, he had worked as an apprentice engineer, as a salesperson at a tailor and in a betting shop.

His final match was at the 1997 Benson & Hedges Masters final when Steve Davis defeated Ronnie O'Sullivan 10–8 after trailing 4–8. This match was interrupted by a woman streaking.

Street refereed in five World Championship finals between 1980 and 1995. He handled the 1992 final between Jimmy White and Stephen Hendry when Hendry came from 8–14 behind to win the match 18–14 by winning 10 consecutive frames.

Street was co-author of several snooker rule books. He died from lung disease in Exeter in 2009 aged 77. Street was married to Jean in 1953, and they had three children.

References

External links
Cuesport article

1932 births
2009 deaths
Snooker referees and officials
English referees and umpires
Sportspeople from Devon